Samuel Goodlove Cosgrove (April 10, 1847March 28, 1909) was an American politician who served as the sixth governor of Washington from January to March 1909. He was a U.S. Civil War veteran and a Republican.

Biography
Cosgrove was born in Tuscarawas County, Ohio to a scholarly family, and one of twelve siblings, most of whom became teachers. He enlisted in the 14th Ohio Volunteer Infantry of the Union Army at the age of sixteen, and served in the Civil War. He was honorably discharged in July 1865.

After the war, Cosgrove taught school at Woodsfield and Brooklyn, Ohio, and attended Ohio Wesleyan University earning M. A. and LL.B. degrees in 1873.  He read law under Hollister and Okey at Woodsfield and was admitted to the bar in 1875. He married Zephorena Edgerton in Cleveland, Ohio, on June 26, 1878.  The couple had three children, Howard, Elliot, and Myrn.

Career
Cosgrove left Ohio in 1880, spent a year mining in Nevada, a year in California, and settled in Pomeroy, Washington in 1882. He practiced law and managed 1400 acres of farm land in Washington and Idaho. He was president of the Pomeroy School Board for eight years, and the city's mayor for five terms.

A candidate for Republican nomination at several state conventions, Cosgrove won the nomination in the first primary after adoption of a direct primary law, when no candidate won the majority and second-choice votes were added. After winning the general election, he suffered a heart attack, was too weak to finish his inaugural address, and was granted a leave of absence, earning him the title "Washington's One-Day Governor".

Death
Cosgrove died March 28, 1909, in Paso Robles, California where he had gone to recuperate. He is interred at Masonic Memorial Park, Tumwater, Washington.

References

Further reading
 Stewart, Edgar I. Washington: Northwest Frontier, New York: Lewis Historical Publishing Co., 1957, p 203.
Available online through the Washington State Library's Classics in Washington History collection

External links
HistoryLink, William Howard Taft and Republicans win general elections in Washington on November 3, 1908.
Washington Secretary of State

National Governors Association

1847 births
1909 deaths
People from Tuscarawas County, Ohio
People from Pomeroy, Washington
People of Ohio in the American Civil War
Ohio Wesleyan University alumni
Mayors of places in Washington (state)
Republican Party governors of Washington (state)